The 2012 William Hill Grand Slam of Darts, was the sixth staging of the tournament, organised by the Professional Darts Corporation. The event took place from 10–18 November 2012 at the Wolverhampton Civic Hall, Wolverhampton, England.

Phil Taylor was the defending champion, but was beaten in the Last 16 by Michael van Gerwen, who went on to make the final, but lost 16–14 to Raymond van Barneveld.

Prize money

Qualifying

Qualifying tournaments

PDC

BDO

Other qualifiers

Pools

Draw

Group stage

All matches first-to-5/best of 9

NB in Brackets: Number = Seeds; BDO = BDO Darts player; RQ = Ranking Qualifier
NB: P = Played; W = Won; L = Lost; LF = Legs for; LA = Legs against; +/- = Plus/minus record, in relation to legs; Average – 3-dart average; Pts = Points; Q = Qualified for K.O. phase

Group A

10 November 

11 November

13 November

Group B

10 November

11 November

13 November

Group C

10 November

11 November

13 November

Group D

10 November

11 November

13 November

Group E

11 November

12 November

14 November

Group F

11 November

12 November

14 November

Group G

11 November

12 November

14 November

Group H

11 November

12 November

14 November

Knockout stage

Scores after player's names are three-dart averages (total points scored divided by darts thrown and multiplied by 3)

Statistics
{|class="wikitable sortable" style="font-size: 95%; text-align: right"
|-
! Player
! Eliminated
! Played
! Legs Won
! Legs Lost
! 100+
! 140+
! 180s
! High checkout
! 3-dart average
|-
|align="left"|  Raymond van Barneveld
| Winner
| 7
| 
| 
| 
| 
| 
| 156
| 96.29
|-
|align="left"|  Michael van Gerwen
| Final
| 7
| 
| 
| 
| 
| 
| 170
| 100.12
|-
|align="left"|  Andy Hamilton
| Semi-finals
| 6
| 
| 
| 
| 
| 
| 152
| 94.14
|-
|align="left"|  Dean Winstanley
| Semi-finals
| 6
| 
| 
| 
| 
| 
| 142
| 94.00
|-
|align="left"|  Scott Waites
| Quarter-finals
| 5
| 
| 
| 
| 
| 
| 148
| 100.12
|-
|align="left"|  Christian Kist
| Quarter-finals
| 5
| 
| 
| 
| 
| 
| 128
| 90.66
|-
|align="left"|  Kevin Painter
| Quarter-finals
| 5
| 
| 
| 
| 
| 
| 121
| 90.38
|-
|align="left"|  John Part
| Quarter-finals
| 5
| 
| 
| 
| 
| 
| 121
| 84.73
|-
|align="left"|  Phil Taylor
| Second round
| 4
| 
| 
| 
| 
| 
| 164
| 98.93
|-
|align="left"|  Gary Anderson
| Second round
| 4
| 
| 
| 
| 
| 
| 130
| 96.94
|-
|align="left"|  Wes Newton
| Second round
| 4
| 
| 
| 
| 
| 
| 164
| 94.85
|-
|align="left"|  Mervyn King
| Second round
| 4
| 
| 
| 
| 
| 
| 126
| 94.68
|-
|align="left"|  Wesley Harms
| Second round
| 4
| 
| 
| 
| 
| 
| 170
| 93.38
|-
|align="left"|  Robert Thornton
| Second round
| 4
| 
| 
| 
| 
| 
| 90
| 93.16
|-
|align="left"|  Brendan Dolan
| Second round
| 4
| 
| 
| 
| 
| 
| 123
| 87.78
|-
|align="left"|  Arron Monk
| Second round
| 4
| 
| 
| 
| 
| 
| 126
| 86.25
|-
|align="left"|  Simon Whitlock
| Group stage
| 3
| 
| 
| 
| 
| 
| 96
| 91.81
|-
|align="left"|  Mark Walsh
| Group stage
| 3
| 
| 
| 
| 
| 
| 164
| 85.84
|-
|align="left"|  Co Stompé
| Group stage
| 3
| 
| 
| 
| 
| 
| 67
| 91.00
|-
|align="left"|  Mark Webster
| Group stage
| 3
| 
| 
| 
| 
| 
| 131
| 90.13
|-
|align="left"|  Paul Nicholson
| Group stage
| 3
| 
| 
| 
| 
| 
| 88
| 90.75
|-
|align="left"|  Terry Jenkins
| Group stage
| 3
| 
| 
| 
| 
| 
| 78
| 90.49
|-
|align="left"|  James Wade
| Group stage
| 3
| 
| 
| 
| 
| 
| 116
| 89.73
|-
|align="left"|  Tony O'Shea
| Group stage
| 3
| 
| 
| 
| 
| 
| 100
| 88.54
|-
|align="left"|  Adrian Lewis
| Group stage
| 3
| 
| 
| 
| 
| 
| 147
| 87.34
|-
|align="left"|  Ted Hankey
| Group stage
| 3
| 
| 
| 
| 
| 
| 161
| 78.35
|-
|align="left"|  Steve Beaton
| Group stage
| 3
| 
| 
| 
| 
| 
| 124
| 92.00
|-
|align="left"|  Wayne Jones
| Group stage
| 3
| 
| 
| 
| 
| 
| 116
| 88.69
|-
|align="left"|  James Hubbard
| Group stage
| 3
| 
| 
| 
| 
| 
| 100
| 88.14
|-
|align="left"|  Martin Phillips
| Group stage
| 3
| 
| 
| 
| 
| 
| 61
| 85.62
|-
|align="left"|  Jan Dekker
| Group stage
| 3
| 
| 
| 
| 
| 
| 72
| 76.43
|-
|align="left"|  Barrie Bates
| Group stage
| 3
| 
| 
| 
| 
| 
| 59
| 75.31
|-

Broadcasting
Sky Sports provided television coverage of the event in the United Kingdom, Fox Sports in Australia, OSN across the Middle East and it was available online and partially televised on RTL7 in the Netherlands.

References

External links
2012 Netzone

2012
Grand Slam
Grand Slam of Darts
Grand Slam of Darts